The 2008 Philadelphia Soul season was the fifth season for the franchise. The Soul started the season by winning their first nine games. Finishing the regular season with a 13–3 record, this was the Soul's best regular season to that point in their then-short history. They won their first Eastern Division title, and went into the playoffs as the top seed in the National Conference. Against the New York Dragons, the Soul won their Divisional round game by a score of 49–48 to advance to the National Conference Championship.  They won that game on July 12, 2008, against the Cleveland Gladiators, 70–35.  They won ArenaBowl XXII in New Orleans on July 27, 2008, against the defending champion San Jose SaberCats.

Standings

Regular season schedule

Playoff schedule

Coaching

Roster

Stats

Regular season

Week 1: vs. Orlando Predators

Week 2: at Chicago Rush

Week 3: vs. New York Dragons

Week 4: at Los Angeles Avengers

Week 5: vs. Tampa Bay Storm

Week 6: vs. Utah Blaze

Week 7: at San Jose SaberCats

Week 8: at Columbus Destroyers

Week 9: vs. Dallas Desperados

Week 10: at Cleveland Gladiators

Week 11: vs. Georgia Force

Week 12: vs. Columbus Destroyers

Week 13: vs. Kansas City Brigade

Week 14: BYE

Week 15: at Dallas Desperados

Week 16: vs. Cleveland Gladiators

Week 17: at New York Dragons

Playoffs

National Conference Divisional: vs. (6) New York Dragons

National Conference Championship: vs. (4) Cleveland Gladiators

ArenaBowl XXII: vs. (2) San Jose SaberCats

Philadelphia Soul
Philadelphia Soul seasons
Philadelphia Soul
ArenaBowl champion seasons